István Jambrik (born 19 June 1968) is a Hungarian sports shooter. He competed in two events at the 2000 Summer Olympics.

References

1968 births
Living people
Hungarian male sport shooters
Olympic shooters of Hungary
Shooters at the 2000 Summer Olympics
Sport shooters from Budapest